Crumlin is a town, community, and an electoral ward in Caerphilly county borough in South Wales, situated in the Ebbw River valley, five miles west of Pontypool, within the historic boundaries of Monmouthshire.

History
Kelly's Directory of South Wales (1895), noted that Crumlin "was a secluded village, scarcely known to any beyond the few persons resident there". It was considered to be one of the most picturesque spots in the county, surrounded by natural features of "unsurpassed loveliness". The name is said to be derived from Cromlech (see Dolmen), "a designation given to Druidical monuments". The village sits in the South Wales Coalfield and in the neighbouring quarries are often found fine fossils of calamites and lepidodendron; and, in the shale outcrops, fossil ferns and other cryptogamic plants.

Crumlin Viaduct

Crumlin is famous for its former railway viaduct. Opened in June 1857 for the Taff Vale Extension to the Newport, Abergavenny and Hereford Railway and closed in 1964 under the Beeching Axe, at 200 feet high and 550 yards in length in two spans (355 yards and 195 yards) it remained the highest railway viaduct in Great Britain throughout its working life. Work by the designer and contractor Thomas W. Kennard commenced in autumn 1853.

Nearby were the railway stations, both at high (viaduct) and valley levels.

Plans for preservation were discussed, but the poor state of repair made this impossible, and the viaduct was dismantled in 1967. Even while demolition work was in progress, scenes for the film Arabesque which starred Sophia Loren and Gregory Peck were being shot on it. As of 2019 the abutments remain visible on the valley sides.

Historic industry
Crumlin was the northern terminus of the Crumlin Arm of the Monmouthshire canal. The canal was built from Crumlin southwards towards Newport, opening in 1794, but not completed at Fourteen Locks until 1799. Tramroads from the ironworks at Ebbw Vale and Nantyglo were built to the canal at Crumlin basin, where the iron was transhipped into canal boats.

When the viaduct was built, the canal was shortened as one of the pillars needed to be located in its path. The canal is no longer in evidence as it was filled in the late 1960s for the construction of the A467 road.

The Crumlin Viaduct Works Company Limited produced the ironwork for the Crumlin Viaduct, they also produced the ironwork for the first Blackfriars Railway Bridge for the London, Chatham and Dover Railway, 120 bridges in Buenos Aires, Argentina, 69 bridges for the Rome and Ancona Railway in Italy, 5 multi-span bridges for railways in India, a 17-span bridge in Pernambuco, Brazil as well as bridges in New Ross, Ireland, the Murray River, Australia and Wolkoff for the Great Russian Railway.

Crumlin Navigation Colliery

The Navigation Colliery was in Crumlin. Sinking commenced in 1907 and completed in 1911, and it was finally closed in 1967. Many colliery buildings remain preserved to the north of the town.

The Crumlin Navigation colliery site contains eleven listed buildings II and II* and is currently managed by the charity Glofa Navigation Cyf for the benefit of the community.

Crumlin Mining School
The Mine Rescue Station was opened in Station Road, Crumlin in 1910 and closed in 1986. It was the first in the South Wales Coalfield.
In 1914 the South Wales and Monmouthshire School of Mines at Treforest established a sister school for part-time students at Crumlin Hall, which later became the Crumlin Mining and Technical College. Crumlin Hall was previously Thomas Kennard's home.

The Crumlin Mural
A mosaic mural in the town centre by Kenneth and Oliver Budd depicts the history of the town and the Ebbw Valley. The viaduct is shown running along the top of a number of the panels.

New industries
Crumlin is the base for Brace's Bakery, a third-generation owned family bakery.

In the 1980s, Marcheast Ltd. made the Land Master, a four-wheel drive vehicle at Crumlin.

Conway Stewart, the pen manufacturer moved to Crumlin in 1968, but the plant was closed in 1975.

Crumlin is home to the popular snack, Pot Noodle. As of 2006 it appeared in a series of TV adverts for the product. The main manufacturing plant, offices and distribution centre are situated there.

Sport and leisure
Crumlin is home to rugby union club, Crumlin RFC; the team is a member of the Welsh Rugby Union and was founded in 1880. Crumlin Cricket Club is the local cricket team and it is a member of the Welsh Cricket Association.

Local democracy
Crumlin is represented in Caerphilly Borough Council as a two-member ward. The current councillors are Carl Thomas (Welsh Labour) and Kristian Woodland (Welsh Labour).

References

External links
 
 
 
 
 
 
 

Towns in Caerphilly County Borough